Brighton is a town in Franklin County, New York, United States. The population was 1,435 at the 2010 census. It was named after Brighton, England, by early surveyors in the region.

The town is in the southern part of the county and is inside the Adirondack Park. Paul Smith's College is in the community of Paul Smiths, a hamlet of Brighton.

History 
The first settlers in this area arrived around 1815 by way of the Northwest Bay Road, a very crude wagon path linking Westport on Lake Champlain with Hopkinton in St. Lawrence County. 

The Town of Brighton was set aside from the town of Duane in 1858 when settlers living in southern Duane complained loudly enough about being left out of town business discussions due to the long distance and time involved. James M. Wardner was elected its first supervisor. Apollos "Paul" Smith arrived in 1859 and gradually built up a hotel in the community that bears his name. Paul Smith's Hotel grew into one of the largest and most well-known, attracting U.S. presidents, governors and other prominent guests.  After Paul Smith's death in 1912, it was run by his son, Phelps Smith, until it burned down in 1930.  Paul Smith's College was established in 1937 after the death of Phelps Smith; it matriculated its first class in 1946.  The college now uses the land where the hotel once stood along Lower St. Regis Lake. Also around that time James Wardner had a small hotel on Rainbow Lake.

Among the "second round" of settlers in the town of Brighton after its pioneers Follensby, S. Johnson, the Rice brothers, Amos and Levi; Oliver Keese and Thomas A. Tomlinson; James and Seth Wardner, were the Ricketsons, the Rands, the Dustins, Jute Q. King and his son, Philemon King. They were scattered along the highway from Keese Mill and McColloms to Paul Smiths to Easy Street to the Split Rock Road and to Rainbow Lake and Jones Pond.

The hamlet now called Gabriels originated when Alfonzo Rand, William Ricketson, the Dustins, and the Otises cleared virgin forest land and began farming the sandy loam soils in the southern part of the town along the boundary with the Town of Harrietstown near Ricketson Brook and today's Split Rock Road.  It wasn't until the Adirondack & St. Lawrence Railway came in 1892 that Gabriels expanded northward with many settling near the railroad station. Following the arrival of the railroad, the Sisters of Mercy established a tuberculosis sanitorium on the small hill near the rail station in 1897.  Around the same time, Muncil's sawmill was established on a siding north of the station. Paul Smith's Hotel immediately started a stage line to the railroad station. When the Sisters of Mercy closed The Gabriels Sanatorium and moved to Lake Placid, the San was sold to Paul Smith's College.  Still later, it was sold to New York State which converted it into Camp Gabriels, a minimum-security state prison.

The Brighton Town Hall was designed and built by Benjamin A. Muncil in 1914. Muncil was a talented local builder who also designed and built Marjorie Merriweather Post's Camp Topridge, and White Pine Camp, which was used as a summer White House of US President Calvin Coolidge. It was listed on the National Register of Historic Places in 2003.

Geography

Brighton is located south of the center of Franklin County within the limits of the Adirondack Forest Preserve. The majority of the town consists of woodlands, lakes, streams and ponds (both publicly and privately owned), with a few areas of developed hamlets and farmland (privately owned). Major water bodies include Upper and Lower St. Regis Lake in the southwest corner of town.

New York State Route 30 is a north-south highway in the town and intersects New York State Route 86 at Paul Smiths. NY 30 leads north  to Malone, the Franklin County seat, and southwest  to Tupper Lake. NY 86 leads southeast  to Saranac Lake.

Demographics

As of the census of 2000, there were 1,682 people, 319 households, and 203 families residing in the town.  The population density was 21.6 people per square mile (8.3/km2).  There were 591 housing units at an average density of 7.6 per square mile (2.9/km2).  The racial makeup of the town was 79.37% White, 18.55% African American, 0.65% Native American, 1.19% Asian, and 0.24% from two or more races. Hispanic or Latino of any race were 0.48% of the population.

There were 319 households, out of which 34.5% had children under the age of 18 living with them, 53.9% were married couples living together, 5.0% had a female householder with no husband present, and 36.1% were non-families. 29.2% of all households were made up of individuals, and 9.1% had someone living alone who was 65 years of age or older.  The average household size was 2.46 and the average family size was 3.04.

In the town, the population was spread out, with 11.7% under the age of 18, 37.5% from 18 to 24, 29.8% from 25 to 44, 15.5% from 45 to 64, and 5.4% who were 65 years of age or older.  The median age was 26 years. For every 100 females, there were 215.0 males.  For every 100 females age 18 and over, there were 246.2 males.

The median income for a household in the town was $42,679, and the median income for a family was $48,250. Males had a median income of $35,952 versus $26,250 for females. The per capita income for the town was $11,995.  About 3.0% of families and 6.2% of the population were below the poverty line, including 5.3% of those under age 18 and 8.7% of those age 65 or over.

Communities and locations in Brighton 

Gabriels – A hamlet in the southeastern part of the town, located on NY-86 at the junction of County Road 30, the site of Camp Gabriels, a former minimum security state prison.
Lower St. Regis Lake – A lake south of Paul Smiths where Paul Smith's College is located.
Meacham Lake – A lake partly in the town at the northern town line.
Osgood Pond – A lake northeast of Paul Smiths.
Paul Smiths – A hamlet in the southern part of the town on NY-30.
Rainbow Lake – (1) A hamlet near the eastern town line, north of Gabriels on County Road 60, and (2) A lake at the eastern town boundary,  near the community of Rainbow Lake.  Rainbow Lake flows into the North Branch of the Saranac River.
Spitfire Lake – A lake south of Lower St. Regis Lake.
Upper St. Regis Lake – A lake at the southern town line.

References

Further reading
Brighton Architectural Heritage Committee, 2002. Brighton 2000: Life in the Town of Brighton, Franklin County, New York in the year 2000, Brighton Architectural Heritage Committee, Paul Smiths, NY, 153 pp.  (Available on CD).
Collins, Geraldine, 1977. The Brighton Story, North Country Books, Lakemont, NY, 202 pp., incl. bibliography.
Kudish, Dr. Michael, 1975. A Preliminary Vascular Flora of the Paul Smiths-Saranac Lake Area, The Adirondacks, New York, With Notes on the Climate, Geology, and Soils, Paul Smith's College, Paul Smiths, NY.
Kudish, Dr. Michael, 1981. Paul Smiths Flora II:  Additional Vascular Plants, Bryophytes (Mosses and Liverworts), Soils and Vegetation, Local Forest History, Paul Smith's College, Paul Smiths, NY.
Kudish, Dr. Michael, 1992. Adirondack Upland Flora, The Chauncy Press, Saranac Lake, N.Y., 316 pp. (In this work, Dr. Kudish, a forest ecologist, brings together all the factors leading to why it is certain plants, trees, bushes grow where they do, in a way understandable to the layman. While applicable to the whole Adirondack Park, Dr. Kudish made extensive use of the town of Brighton and the surrounding area.)
Kudish, Dr. Michael, 2004. Historical Update: Paul Smith's College Lands, Forests, and Buildings 1981 to 2004, Paul Smith's College, Paul Smiths, NY, 76 pp., incl. index. (Contains much information about the Town of Brighton)
"Town of Brighton Smart Growth Plan", 9 July 2009, prepared by F.X. Browne, Inc., Saranac Lake, NY., 36 pp. (incl. biblio), six appendices provide supporting information.
Wardner, Charles A., 2010. Footprints & Sunset on Adirondack Trails: The Memoirs of James Manchester Wardner 1831-1904, privately published by Joan Wardner Allen, printed by Graphics North, Jay, NY.

External links

 Town of Brighton official website
 Town Historical Notes
 Early history of Brighton

Adirondacks
Towns in Franklin County, New York